Engagement Ring (Spanish: Anillo de compromiso) is a 1951 Mexican drama film directed by Emilio Gómez Muriel and starring David Silva, Martha Roth and Carmen Montejo. It was written by Luis Alcoriza.

Cast
David Silva	 	
Martha Roth	 	
Carmen Montejo	 	
Andrés Soler	
Miguel Manzano		
Felipe de Alba	
José María Linares-Rivas	
Nicolás Rodríguez	
Cuco Sánchez	
Beatriz Ramos	
Armando Arriola	
Francisco Reiguera	
Olga Donoso		
Juan Pulido	 	
Diana Ochoa

References

External links
 

1951 films
1950s Spanish-language films
Mexican drama films
1951 drama films
Films directed by Emilio Gómez Muriel
Mexican black-and-white films
1950s Mexican films